Ezerche is a village in northeastern Bulgaria, part of Tsar Kaloyan Municipality, Razgrad Province. It has a population of about 2,000.

It is the birthplace of the artist Radi Nedelchev and the 1960 Olympic champion Dimitar Dobrev and Mehmed Hyusmenov Kodakov world championship medalist was also born there

External links
Facts on Ezerche

Villages in Razgrad Province